The New Cathedral, also known as the Cathedral of the Immaculate Conception, is a Roman Catholic cathedral located in Linz, Austria. The neo-Gothic church is the largest, though not the tallest church in Austria.

History

Construction plans were started in 1855 by Bishop Franz-Josef Rudigier. The first stone was laid on 1 May 1862—an event solemnised by the performance of Anton Bruckner's Festive Cantata Preiset den Herrn.

In 1924 Bishop Johannes Maria Gföllner consecrated the finished building as the Cathedral of the Immaculate Conception. The plans, drawn by the master builder of the Archdiocese of Cologne, Vincenz Statz, were made in the French high Gothic style.

With 20,000 seats, the cathedral is the largest (130 meters long, and the ground 5,170 square meters), but not the highest, church in Austria. The originally-planned, higher spire was not approved, because in Austria-Hungary at the time, no building was allowed to be taller than the South Tower of the St. Stephen's Cathedral in Vienna. At 135 m, the New Cathedral is two meters shorter than the Viennese cathedral.

Particularly noteworthy are the cathedral's stained glass windows. The most famous is the Linz Window, which depicts the history of Linz.  The windows also contain portraits of the various sponsors of the church's construction. During the Second World War some windows, particularly in the southern part of the cathedral, were damaged. Instead of restoring the original windows, they have been replaced with windows displaying modern art. 
Also noteworthy is the nativity scene in the church burial vault, with its figures made by S. Osterrieder, and the display of the regalia of Bishop Rudigier.

Politics 

In October 2006 the Catholic Church added a plaquet to the commemorative wood cut for Engelbert Dollfuß at the New Cathedral, which caused excitement in the ÖVP. In the plaque the church, by resolution of the Austrian Conference of Catholic Bishops, distances itself from the original cut and proclaims the future abstention from party politics. Dollfuß as acting Chancellor of Austria in 1933 eliminated the parliament over formal irregularities. This caused the Austrian Civil War and led to a dictatorship.

Gallery

References
The information in this article is based on that in its German equivalent.

External links

Homepage Mariendom

Roman Catholic cathedrals in Austria
Tourist attractions in Linz
Gothic Revival church buildings in Austria
1924 establishments in Austria
Roman Catholic churches in Linz
20th-century Roman Catholic church buildings in Austria